Vũ Quang Nam (born 22 August 1992) is a Vietnamese footballer who plays as a winger for V.League 2 club Cần Thơ.  He started his career with Sông Lam Nghệ An

Honours

Club
Sông Lam Nghệ An
 U-21 Championship: 2012

References 

1992 births
Living people
Vietnamese footballers
Association football midfielders
V.League 1 players
Song Lam Nghe An FC players
People from Hà Tĩnh province
Vietnam international footballers
Southeast Asian Games bronze medalists for Vietnam
Southeast Asian Games medalists in football
Competitors at the 2015 Southeast Asian Games